Queen's Day or Koninginnedag was a national holiday in the Kingdom of the Netherlands from 1890 to 2013 that was succeeded by King's Day or Koningsdag.

Queen's Day may also refer to:
 International Women's Day or Queen's Day
 Queen's Official Birthday, a celebration of the birthday of the Monarch of the United Kingdom and the other Commonwealth realms when the Monarch is a Queen.
 Queene's Day, a celebration of the accession of Queen Elizabeth I